Aquinas College is a private Roman Catholic liberal arts college in Grand Rapids, Michigan.

History
The Congregation of Our Lady of the Sacred Heart of the Order of Preachers (Dominicans), today commonly known as the "Dominican Sisters of Grand Rapids", led by Mother Aquinata Fiegler, OP, founded the Novitiate Normal School in Traverse City, Michigan in 1886. The school's mission was to educate young women who had yet to make their vows in the Order (i.e., novices), to be parochial school teachers throughout Michigan. It trained and sent forth numerous sister teachers successfully. In 1911, the school was transferred to Grand Rapids, along with the motherhouse of the sisters, pursuant to an invitation of the bishop of the young Diocese of Grand Rapids.

In response to the need for their sister teachers to hold baccalaureate degrees, in 1922 the sisters reorganized the Novitiate Normal School as Sacred Heart College and also commenced admitting lay women. The State of Michigan granted a charter to award two-year degrees to women to the new college in the same year. The site of the new college was transferred to the newly erected motherhouse of the Sisters on East Fulton Street, in the margins of Grand Rapids. At some time between 1922 and 1931 it was renamed as Marywood College. In 1931, it was reorganized as Catholic Junior College, transferred to a site on Ransom Street adjacent to the Grand Rapids Public Library, and became the first Roman Catholic college in the United States governed by women religious to become coeducational. Bishop Joseph G. Pinten of Grand Rapids instigated the reform to admit men alongside women. At that time it awarded two-year degrees.

In 1939, Catholic Junior College added a third year to its curriculum. The college began awarding four-year baccalaureate degrees and was renamed Aquinas College in honor of St. Thomas Aquinas and its founder, Mother Aquinata Fiegler, OP, in 1940, but the articles of incorporation to legally effect the institutional change were not filed with the State of Michigan until 1941. In 1945, Mother Euphrasia Sullivan, OP executed for the college the purchase of the Holmdene Mansion, erected by Edward Lowe in 1908, and its arboreal lands, at 1607 Robinson Road, bordering East Fulton Street. The college relocated to the former Lowe estate where it is sited to this day. The North Central Association accredited it in 1946.

In 1948 students instituted a chapter of the Dominican Third (Secular) Order (tertiaries; TOP). In May 1950 the outdoor Shrine of Our Lady of Fatima was dedicated, in memory of the members of Aquinas College who sacrificed their lives in the Second World War, after a student and alumni campaign of two years.

The 1950s and 1960s were a period of great growth and construction and during them the college abandoned and sold the original campus on Ransom Street. In 1955 the new Administration Building, now the "Academic Building", was erected.

In 1974 the college became legally independent of the Dominican Sisters of Grand Rapids. In 1975 the name of the athletic teams was changed from the "Tommies" to the "Saints", pursuant to a student poll, because African American members had been racially ridiculed as "Toms".

In 1977 the college was accredited to award its first graduate degree, the Master's of Management in business, which was distinct from the conventional Master of Business Administration (MBA) degree awarded by other institutions because it was primarily based on the humanities and not mathematics. In 1993 the college awarded its first doctorate degree, albeit honoris causa.

Also in 1997, the college officially named its mascot, a St. Bernard dog, "Nelson" in honor of President Paul Nelson, who retired that year. In 1998 the college was reorganized into three schools, each led by a dean and subdivided into departments: the School of Education, the School of Liberal Arts and Sciences, and the School of Management.

A marker designating the college as a Michigan Historic Site was erected by the Michigan History Division, Department of State in 1962. The inscription reads:

Aquinas had its beginning in 1887 as the Novitiate Normal School of the Dominican Sisters of Marywood. In 1922 it became Marywood College of the Sacred Heart. When the college was moved downtown in 1931, it became the coeducational Catholic Junior College. It began operating as a four-year college in 1940 and was named in honor of the great medieval theologian and philosopher, Saint Thomas Aquinas. Aquinas is primarily a liberal arts college. It was moved to this campus, the former Lowe estate, in 1945.

Campus
The arboreal campus is in Grand Rapids, Michigan. The college has four dormitories: Dominican Hall, Hruby Hall, Regina Hall, and St. Joseph Hall. It also has five apartment buildings on campus and five "living learning communities", denominated "houses" on campus.

Student publications and radio
Publications:
 The Paraclete, a Catholic news and commentary publication; and
 The Torch

The student radio station is "AQ Sound".

Administration
The college is headed by a president and board of trustees.

The college's first administrator was Monsignor Bukowski, for whom its chapel is named. In February, 1969, Dr. Norbert J. Hruby succeeded Monsignor Bukowski as president. Hruby Hall, an administrative building and residence hall on campus, bears his name. Aquinas's third president, Dr. Peter D. O’Connor, served from 1986 to 1990. Mr. R. Paul Nelson served as the fourth president from 1990 to 1997 followed by Dr. Harry J. Knopke from 1997 to 2006. On July 1, 2006, Provost C. Edward Balog was named interim president and he became the college's sixth president in May 2007; he retired on June 30, 2011. Dr. Juan Olivarez became the seventh president on July 1, 2011, and retired upon completion of the school year in the spring of 2017. Dr. Kevin Quinn is the eighth and current president of the college.

Notable past members of the board of trustees include Chairman Lt. General John Nowak, United States Air Force (Ret.) and Sr. Nathalie Meyer, OP, Prioress of the Dominican Sisters of Grand Rapids. Trustees Emeriti also include Msgr. William Duncan, Vicar General of the Roman Catholic Diocese of Grand Rapids; Sr. M. Aquinas Weber, OP; and local philanthropists Martin Allen, Jr., Peter Wege, and Kate Pew Wolters.

Athletics
The Aquinas athletic teams are called the Saints. The university is a member of the National Association of Intercollegiate Athletics (NAIA), primarily competing in the Wolverine–Hoosier Athletic Conference (WHAC) since the 1992–93 academic year.

Aquinas compete in 30 intercollegiate varsity sports: Men's sports include baseball, basketball, bowling, cross country, golf, ice hockey, lacrosse, rugby, soccer, swimming & diving, tennis, track & field and volleyball; while women's sports basketball, bowling, cross country, dance, golf, ice hockey, lacrosse, rugby, soccer, softball, stunt, swimming & diving, tennis, track & field and volleyball; and co-ed sports include cheerleading and eSports.

Academics

The college has more than 2,000 undergraduate and graduate students and offers 61 majors, awarding bachelor's degrees and master's degrees. It is accredited by the Higher Learning Commission. Its most popular undergraduate majors, in terms of 2021 graduates, were:
Business Administration & Management (39)
Psychology (29)
Liberal Arts & Sciences/Liberal Studies (26)
Business/Corporate Communications (16)
Speech Communication & Rhetoric (15)
Biology/Biological Sciences (11)
Elementary Education & Teaching (11)

Many graduates continue to graduate schools: approximately 90% of pre-medical students are accepted into medical schools. The opportunity to study away is a major attraction to many students, as many study for a semester at an international institution. Programs currently offered include: England, Spain, Italy, Ireland, France, Costa Rica, Germany, Japan, and Dominican Exchange (US). Short term faculty-led trips are also offered.

Notable alumni

 Paul Assenmacher, pitcher of the baseball team in the late 1970s and early 1980s before playing for five Major League Baseball teams during a career of 14 years; 
 Dave Gumpert, pitched for three Major League Baseball teams during five seasons in the mid-1980s, and was a Canadian sportscaster;
 Dave Joppie, current minor league hitting instructor for the Milwaukee Brewers.
 Kenneth Marin, professor of economics at Aquinas College and a member of the White House Consumer Advisory Council where he served on Wage and Price Control in the mid-1960s appointed by President Lyndon B. Johnson. He went to Tanzania in the late sixties and worked as an economic advisor to the government of President Julius Nyerere until the early 1970s.
 Godfrey Mwakikagile, a Tanzanian writer and scholar of African studies who has written non-fiction books on African history, politics, and economics and others works; his books are found in collegiate and public libraries throughout the world; they are primarily for academicians. Kenneth Marin was his professor of economics in 1976. The first book Godfrey Mwakikagile wrote was also about economics, Economic Development in Africa, published in 1999.
Enos Bukuku, a Tanzanian who was a student of Kenneth Marin in the 1960s and became a professor of economics at the University of Dar es Salaam. He earned his bachelor's degree in economics from Aquinas College, his master's and PhD from the University of Dar es Salaam and went on to work as an economic advisor to President Julius Nyerere of Tanzania. He later served as Deputy Governor of the Bank of Tanzania which is the Tanzania Central Bank and as Deputy Secretary-General of the East African Community (EAC) among other high-ranking posts including serving as chairman of the Board of the Tanzania Revenue Authority (TRA).
Glenn Steil Sr., member of the Michigan Senate
 Brian Williams, 1968 graduate who began his broadcasting career while calling the college's basketball play-by-play in 1967; his professional career started with Toronto's CHUM radio, included a year at CFRB Radio in Toronto, Ontario, Canada, and thereafter employment at CBC Television's Toronto station, CBLT; with more than 25 years of broadcasting experience, he is considered the dean of Canadian sport commentators.

References

External links
 
 Official athletics website

 
Association of Catholic Colleges and Universities
Dominican universities and colleges in the United States
Education in Grand Rapids, Michigan
Educational institutions established in 1886
1886 establishments in Michigan
Liberal arts colleges in Michigan
Universities and colleges in Kent County, Michigan
Tourist attractions in Grand Rapids, Michigan
Catholic universities and colleges in Michigan